Chongqing Nankai Middle School is a senior high school in Chongqing, China. It is located in  Chenjiawan, Shapingba District. In a 2016 ranking of Chinese high schools that send students to study in American universities, Chongqing Nankai Middle School ranked number 28 in mainland China in terms of the number of students entering top American universities.

History

In the summer of 1936, educator Zhang Boling, the founder of Tianjin Nankai High School, went to Chongqing and built a private school, Nanyu Secondary School (南渝中学; Nanyu means South Chongqing). After the Marco Polo Bridge Incident, Tianjin Nankai High School was heavily damaged by Japanese air raids. Many students and teachers fled to southwestern China. Many went to Chongqing, and joined Nanyu Middle School, while others went to Zigong and joined Shuguang High School, another high school under Zhang Boling's management. In December 1938, Nanyu Middle School changed its name to (Private) Chongqing Nankai Secondary School. After the founding of the People's Republic of China, its name was changed to Chongqing No. 3 Secondary School. In the 1980s, it reverted to the name Chongqing Nankai Secondary School.

The school campus covers an area of 362 mu (24 hectares). The campus has facilities such as science and computer laboratories, an astronomical observatory, a library, a school history museum, an indoor sports hall, a grand auditorium, an artistic centre, two outdoor stadiums, an indoor swimming pool, student dorms and Business Street. The school’s library has over 150 thousand volumes.

Chongqing Nankai Secondary School has a teaching staff of about 200, including 90 senior teachers, 9 special-graded teachers and 9 research fellows. Over 105 young teachers have a master's degree or above. The school participates in academic exchanges and has established academic relations with schools in the United States and Japan. About 30 teachers have been sent abroad on lecture tours or for advanced studies. Teachers in the school have won national prizes for improvement in teaching method and some teachers were specially rewarded by the state council.

More than 20 graduates have become the deputies of People’s Congress and members of The Chinese People's Political Consultative Conference (CPPCC) in the school.

The school enrolment is over 6000, about 3000 of them living on campus. Every year about 99% of graduates enrol in colleges, among whom about 90% enter national universities. The number of students admitted by Peking University or Tsinghua University has been the highest among schools in Chongqing for years.

Celebrated scientists including some thirty academicians of the Chinese Academy of Science and the Chinese Academy of Engineering, educationalists, leaders of the CPC and the central government have graduated from the school in the past six decades.

The school has developed an education technology center, astronomical observatory, website and distance educational network.

Overview

The school previously owned significant assets in Nankai Cheng, but these were sold for commercial purposes in 1994. This gave the school a chance to heavily improve its campus environment. Now Chongqing Nankai Secondary school has another campus, called Naikai (Rongqiao) middle school, which is located at Fenglin Rd, Nan'an, Chongqing, China. The new campus opened in 2004 used to only had students in 7th and 8th grade and those in 9th grade usually went back to the old main campus in Shapingba. 2015 class was the last class to have the tradition of returning. Since 2016 students in Naikai (Rongqiao) no longer transfer back to Naikai Secondary School. Instead, all middle school students will finish all three years in the new campus.

Notable alumni

Academicians

33 graduates are members of the Chinese Academy of Science and Chinese Academy of Engineering:
Zhu Guangya (朱光亚)
Zhou Guangzhao (周光召)
Yuan-Cheng Fung (冯元桢)
Guo Kexin (郭可信)
Liang Sili (梁思礼)
Zhou Heng (周恒)

Politicians
Zou Jiahua (邹家华)
Zheng Bijian (郑必坚)
Yan Mingfu (阎明复)

Economists
Mao Yushi (茅于轼)
Wu Jinglian (吴敬琏)
Morris Chang(张忠谋)

Arts and Media
Yan Su (阎肃)
Roy Wang (王源)

See also
Sister schools:
 Nankai University
 Tianjin Nankai High School

Notes and references
Notes

References

External links
Official website
Official website 
A history of “Nankai School”
 baidu tieba of the school

1936 establishments in China
Educational institutions established in 1936
High schools in Chongqing
Shapingba District